The 1933 Delaware Fightin' Blue Hens football team was an American football team that represented the University of Delaware in the 1933 college football season. In their third season under head coach Charles Rogers, the Blue Hens compiled a 2–4–2 record and were outscored by a total of 102 to 46. The team played its home games at Frazer Field in Newark, Delaware.

Schedule

References

Delaware
Delaware Fightin' Blue Hens football seasons
Delaware Fightin' Blue Hens football